Ashes of Vengeance is a 1923 American drama film directed by Frank Lloyd and starring Norma Talmadge and Wallace Beery.

Plot
At the ball celebrating the wedding of Henry of Navarre on August 23, 1572, the evil Queen Mother Catherine de' Medici (Josephine Crowell) persuades her son King Charles IX to sign a decree to exterminate the Huguenots. Meanwhile, at that same ball the Comte de la Roche (Courtenay Foote) puts the moves on Margot de Vaincoire (Betty Francisco), fiancée of Rupert de Vrieac (Conway Tearle).  The de la Roches and de Vrieacs have been enemies for years and Rupert challenges the Comte to a duel. In their duel Rupert wins, but spares the Comte’s life so he will be obligated to him. Rupert and Margot are Huguenots while the Comte is a Catholic of the Queen Mother’s party. The Comte is sent to kill Rupert, but instead takes him to Margot’s house, which he has put under guard so the mob can’t attack it. There the Comte says he will arrange to spare them both if Rupert will agree to become his servant for five years. At the pleading of Margot, Rupert agrees.  The Comte takes Rupert to his castle where his two sisters Yoeland (Norma Talmadge) and the crippled Anne (Jeanne Carpenter) live. Yoeland despises him when she finds out who Rupert is. However, when a captured wolf escapes, threatening her and Anne, yet Rupert defeats it with his bare hands her attitude starts to soften. Yoeland goes to see her cousin Denise, who is being forced by her uncle Louis de la Roches into an arranged marriage with the Duc de Tours. Yoeland takes Rupert as her escort. However Denise loves Phillipe de Vois, who is a poor nobleman. Then Anton, Rupert’s servant brings word that Margot de Vaincoire has married someone else. The Duc of Tours (Wallace Beery) arrives for his wedding.

Denise’s father is called to Paris, leaving the Duc in charge of his castle. The Duc is revealed as a drunken brute, terrorizing the serfs and trying to seduce both Yoeland and a servant girl, killing her guardsman lover. The castle guards determine to avenge their dead comrade, so Yoeland directs Rupert to protect the Duc since he is her uncle’s guest. Rupert and few men battle the castle guard. Father Paul, Denise’s confessor escapes and brings back Phillipe de Vois and his men to save them. During the fight Yoeland realizes she loves Rupert. However, when she finds a lock of blonde hair in his doublet, while nursing the wounded Rupert back to health she thinks Rupert still loves Margot. Yoeland stops the Duc from torturing the dead guardsman’s brother and lover who instigated the attack on him. Phillipe de Vois and Denise elope, which the Duc allows to happen, as he intends to threaten Rupert with blinding with a hot poker to force Yoeland to marry him. She agrees but the guardsmen save them. Rupert and the Duc duel, but the Duc is stabbed in the back by the lover of the guardsman he killed. At Yoeland’s request her brother releases Rupert from his oath and after Yoeland learns the blonde hair was from Anne’s doll that she gave to Rupert as a token, Yoeland and Rupert become engaged.

Cast

Preservation
A complete print of Ashes of Vengeance is maintained at the Library of Congress and a partial copy consisting of two reels is in the George Eastman Museum Motion Picture Collection.

References

External links

 (4 minute film clip)

Films directed by Frank Lloyd
1923 films
American silent feature films
Films produced by Joseph M. Schenck
First National Pictures films
American black-and-white films
Films set in the 1570s
1920s historical drama films
American historical drama films
1923 drama films
1920s English-language films
1920s American films
Silent American drama films